Pier 70 in San Francisco, California, is a historic pier in San Francisco's Potrero Point neighborhood, home to the Union Iron Works and later to Bethlehem Shipbuilding. It was one of the largest industrial sites in San Francisco during the two World Wars. Today, it is regarded as the best-preserved 19th century industrial complex west of the Mississippi.

Physical plant 

History 
The area around Pier 70 has been used for shipbuilding since the Gold Rush. Since becoming home to the Union Iron Works in 1883, Pier 70 has been occupied by a variety of industrial concerns, including the Pacific Rolling Mills, Risdon Iron & Locomotive, Kneass Boat Works, Union Iron Works, Bethlehem Shipbuilding, and BAE Systems.

After Bethlehem acquired Union Iron Works in 1905, the pier also housed Bethlehem Shipbuilding Corporation's administrative offices in Building 101.

Bethlehem Steel sold their holdings in the area to the Port of SF in 1980.

In the 1990s, the Eureka Dry Dock, former USS Steadfast (AFDM-14), was acquired by the BAE Systems and are now still in use at the Pier.

Current state and development 

As of Jan 3, 2017, the facility is operated by Puglia Engineering, Inc, who operate 2 other ship repair facilities in Washington State. Puglia Engineering purchased the facility from BAE Systems Ship Repair in January, 2017. The two dry docks were formerly operated by BAE Systems San Francisco Ship Repair, employing approximately 200 people.

Most of the pier's buildings have been unoccupied since the decline of shipbuilding in the area. However, some of the pier's historic buildings are still used, one is used for artist studios.

In 2015, the Port of San Francisco started planning to redevelop the pier for mixed commercial and residential use in partnership with Orton Development, Inc. and Forest City Development. The redevelopment was expected to include roughly a thousand housing units and two million square feet of office space. In 2013, plans included a "Crane Cove Park" that would feature the historic cranes in the northern part of the pier complex.

A $120 million restoration and rehabilitation effort for the eight buildings in the pier's historic core began in 2015 and is expected to complete in 2017.

Several of the buildings are used as a large-scale event venue operated by Pier 70 Partners.

Historic buildings 

Potrero Point is eligible for the National Register as a historic district for its contribution to three war efforts (Spanish–American War, World War I & World War II) and because of the 19th-century buildings that remain. Some of the buildings are individually eligible for landmarking for their architectural and historic merit. Worthy of historical landmark status is the 1917 Frederick Meyer Renaissance Revival Bethlehem office building, the Charles P. Weeks designed 1912 Power House#1, the 1896 Union Iron Works office designed by Percy & Hamilton, and the huge 1885 Machine shops.

References

External links 
History of Pier 70, including map
Port of San Francisco Pier 70 Information Page
Pier 70 : Curbed SF

Landmarks in San Francisco